"Hushabye" is a song that was written by Doc Pomus and Mort Shuman in 1959 for the Brooklyn doo-wop quintet the Mystics. The group's recording of the song was a Top 20 hit.

Background
In the spring of 1959, the Mystics recorded the modern South African folk song "Wimoweh" to serve as their debut release on Laurie Records: after Laurie shelved the track as lacking hit potential – the song would in fact become a 1961 #1 hit for the Tokens as "The Lion Sleeps Tonight" – the Mystics were set to record the Doc Pomus/ Mort Shuman composition "Teenager in Love". According to Al Contrera of the Mystics, the day after the Mystics had first heard "Teenage in Love", Laurie Records president Gene Schwarz advised the group that "their song" would instead be given to Dion & the Belmonts who had recorded three Top 40 hits, Schwarz's position being that "Teenager in Love"'s potential to be a smash hit was more likely to be realized via a recording by an established act. ("Teenager in Love" as recorded by Dion & the Belmonts would indeed rise as high as #5 on the Billboard Hot 100.) (Al Contrera quote:)"We were very disappointed. And Doc Pomus and Mort Shuman were disappointed too, because they wrote ['Teenager in Love'] specifically for us. So Doc says: 'We’re gonna write another song for you.'...And Gene Schwartz said to Doc and Morty: 'Could you write something in the flavor of "Little Star" by the Elegants?'”. "Little Star", a #1 hit in the summer of 1958, had been an uptempo song built around lines from the nursery rhyme "Twinkle Twinkle Little Star": with "Hushabye", Pomus and Shuman accommodated Schwarz's request by similarly building the song from the opening lines of the traditional lullaby entitled ""Hush-a-bye".  

Personnel on the recording session for the Mystics' "Hushabye" included Al Caiola and Bucky Pizzarelli on guitars and Panama Francis on drums. Released in April 1959, the record would spend sixteen weeks on Billboard Hot 100 (nine of those in the top 40), peaking at #20. Adopted by disc jockey Alan Freed as the closing tune on his televised Saturday night "Big Beat Show",  "Hushabye" would essentially establish the Mystics as one-hit wonders as their follow-up release "Don't Take the Stars" stalled at #98 on the Billboard Hot 100 and the group's subsequent four Laurie Records releases were all Hot 100 shortfalls.

The Beach Boys version

Overview
"Hushabye" was covered by the Beach Boys on their 1964 album All Summer Long, featuring Brian Wilson and Mike Love on lead vocals. In 1993, two new versions of the song appeared on the Beach Boys' Good Vibrations box set, one live version and the other a split track with vocals in one channel and instruments in the other.

Personnel
Partially sourced from Craig Slowinski.

The Beach Boys

 Al Jardine  – backing vocals, bass guitar
 Mike Love  – lead vocals, backing vocals
 Brian Wilson  – lead vocals, backing vocals, piano
 Carl Wilson  – backing vocals, electric guitar
 Dennis Wilson  – backing vocals, drums

Additional musicians

 Glen Campbell  – 6-string bass guitar (uncertain)
 Ray Pohlman  – 6-string bass guitar (uncertain)

Other versions
 1966 – The Kingsmen, Up And Away
 1969 – Jay and the Americans, Sands of Time: single reached #62 on the Billboard Hot 100 (lead vocalist Jay Traynor had been a latterday member of the Mystics) and #42 in Canada.
 1972 - Robert John, Atlantic 45-2884: single reached #99 on the Billboard Hot 100 
 2000- Stacey Kent, Album  The Christmas song

See also
 List of 1950s one-hit wonders in the United States

References

External links
George Galfo's Mystics (with Original Founding Mystic)
Original Mystics with Phil Cracolici-original voice of Hushabye
Mystic Memories featuring Hushabye video
review of Beach Boys album All Summer Long

1959 songs
Songs with lyrics by Doc Pomus
Songs with music by Mort Shuman
The Beach Boys songs
Jay and the Americans songs
Robert John songs